Parlby is a surname. Notable people with the surname include:

 Irene Parlby (1868–1965), Canadian women's farm leader, activist, and politician
 Joshua Parlby (1855–?), English football manager
 Thomas Parlby (1727–1802), British civil engineering contractor
 William Hampton Parlby (1801–1881), British Army officer